is a national highway of Japan that traverses southern Aomori Prefecture and  briefly crosses into the northeastern edge of Akita before returning in to Aomori. It connects Hachinohe in eastern Aomori to Ōwani in the western part of the prefecture.

Route description

National Route 454 begins at an intersection with National Route 104 near the central district of Hachinohe in eastern Aomori Prefecture. From there, the highway travels through the city headed west. It has a junction with the branch route of the Hachinohe Expressway that is accessible only if drivers have electronic toll collection enabled. Continuing west to the town of Gonohe, the road runs concurrently with National Route 4 for about four kilometers traveling north. After departing the concurrency heading west once again the road enters the village of Shingō, then crosses into Akita Prefecture. Curving to the north, the road reaches the southern shore of Lake Towada and reenters Aomori Prefecture where it shares a concurrency with National Route 103 as the roads travel west along the shore of the lake. The concurrency enters Akita Prefecture once again before National Route 103 leaves the concurrency, heading southwest while National Route 454 continues north along the western shore. Upon reaching the northern shore of the lake, the route enters Aomori Prefecture once more and has a junction with National Route 102 immediately after. At the junction the routes merge, sharing a concurrency traveling northwest away from the lake. After about fifteen kilometers together, the routes separate, with National Route 454 heading southwest through Hirakawa. The road crosses into Ōwani where it terminates upon meeting National Route 7.

History
National Route 454 was established by the Cabinet of Japan along its current route in April 1993.

Major intersections
All junctions listed are at-grade intersections unless noted otherwise.

See also

References

External links

National highways in Japan
Roads in Akita Prefecture
Roads in Aomori Prefecture
1993 establishments in Japan